Nicola Daly (born 3 April 1988), also referred to as Nicci Daly or Nikki Daly, is an Ireland women's field hockey international. She was a member of the Ireland team that played in the 2018 Women's Hockey World Cup final. In 2010 Daly was a member of the Loreto team that won the Irish Senior Cup. Since 2016 Daly has worked in motorsport as a data engineer for Juncos Racing.

Early years, family and education
Daly is the daughter of Vivion and Carmel Daly. She has three siblings. Vivion Daly was a former Formula Ford racing driver. She is also the niece of Derek Daly, the former Formula One driver and a first cousin of Conor Daly, the IndyCar driver. In addition to playing Gaelic football and field hockey, Daly spent many weekends during her youth at Mondello Park watching her father compete. Between 2000 and 2006, Daly attended The High School, Dublin where her fellow students included Alison Meeke. Between 2006 and 2011 she attended the Institute of Technology, Tallaght on a sports scholarship and gained an honours degree in Mechanical Engineering. Between 2012 and 2013 she attended the School of Applied Sciences at Cranfield University where she gained an MSc in Motorsport Engineering and Management.

Gaelic football

Ballyboden Wanderers
Daly played Gaelic football for Ballyboden Wanderers GAA at club level. Together with Alison Meeke, she was a member of the Wanderers team that won the 2008 Dublin Ladies Junior E Football Championship.

Dublin
Daly represented Dublin at under-14 level. Her team mates included Lyndsey Davey. Daly made her debut for the Dublin senior ladies' football team in 2009. She was subsequently named as a Dublin Ladies Gaelic Football All-Star for 2009. Daly eventually decided to concentrate on playing field hockey after being selected to play for Ireland.

Field hockey

High School, Dublin
Between 2000 and 2006, Daly played field hockey for The High School, Dublin. Her team mates and fellow students included Alison Meeke. In the 2005 Leinster Schoolgirls' Senior Cup final, Daly played in a High School team that lost 4–2 to an Alexandra College team featuring Nicola Evans. Daly and Meeke were also members the High School team that finished as runners-up in the 2005 Leinster Schoolgirls' Premier League. In the final they lost 2–0 to an Our Lady's, Terenure team captained by Emer Lucey.

Glenanne
Daly played for Glenanne during the 2008–09 season. She scored on her Glenanne debut, a 1–1 draw against Bray in the Leinster Division 1. She was encouraged to play for Glenanne by Graham Shaw. Her teammates at Glenanne included Mary Waldron.

Loreto
Daly first played for Loreto from 2009 until 2013. On 9 May 2010, together with Hannah Matthews, Nikki Symmons, Lizzie Colvin and Alison Meeke, Daly was a member of the Loreto team that won the Irish Senior Cup. They defeated Railway Union in a penalty shoot-out after the game had finished 2–2.   The team was coached by Graham Shaw. On 13 May 2012 Daly also played for Loreto in the Irish Senior Cup final against UCD. She scored Loreto's second goal in a 3–2 defeat. Daly also helped Loreto finish as runners up in the 2012–13 Women's Irish Hockey League. Daly re-joined Loreto for the latter half of the 2017–18 season. She subsequently scored the opening goal as Loreto defeated Cork Harlequins 2–1 to win the 2018 EY Champions Trophy.

Holcombe
Daly played for Holcombe in the Women's England Hockey League between 2013 and 2015. Her teammates at Holcombe included  Megan Frazer.
While playing for  Holcombe she also worked at Ford Dagenham and the Dunton Technical Centre as a test engineer.

Muckross
Daly played for Muckross in the Leinster League during the 2015–16 season.

Ireland international
Daly made her debut for Ireland against Belgium in February 2010. In March 2015 Daly was a member of the Ireland team that won a 2014–15 Women's FIH Hockey World League Round 2 tournament hosted in Dublin, defeating Canada in the final after a penalty shoot-out. On 10 June 2015 she scored an acclaimed solo goal against South Africa in the 2014–15 Women's FIH Hockey World League Semifinals. A report in The Irish Times declared "Daly picks up the ball 25 yards out, runs around defenders, pops the ball in the air and volleys it past the Springbok goalkeeper, all at full pace". Daly was a member of the Ireland team that won the 2015 Women's EuroHockey Championship II, defeating the Czech Republic 5–0 in the final. In January 2017 she was also a member of the Ireland team that won a 2016–17 Women's FIH Hockey World League Round 2 tournament in Kuala Lumpur, defeating Malaysia 3–0 in the final.

Daly represented Ireland at the 2018 Women's Hockey World Cup and was a prominent member of the team that won the silver medal. She featured in all of Ireland's games throughout the tournament, including the pool games against the United States, India, and England, the quarter-final against India, the semi-final against Spain and the final against the Netherlands.

In interviews, Daly has revealed how Mariah Carey's All I Want for Christmas Is You became the team's unofficial theme song. Daly explained that some of the younger members of the team had said that the excitement and anticipation they experienced during the tournament "felt like Christmas Eve." The team subsequently began singing the song during training sessions and again during their homecoming celebrations.

Motor racing

Data engineer
Since April 2016 Daly has worked as a data engineer for Juncos Racing, based in Indianapolis. Her cousin, Conor Daly, had previously raced for the same team. While working for Juncos she lived with her uncle, Derek Daly.  While based in Indianapolis, Daly also worked as a volunteer field hockey coach with Indiana Hoosiers.

Racing driver
On 19 August 2018, just two weeks after playing for Ireland in the 2018 Women's Hockey World Cup final, Daly made her debut as a motor racing driver at Mondello Park. Daly drove as part of the Formula Female team in an event celebrating the track's 50th anniversary. She also co-founded the team. Daly was raising money for the Irish Cancer Society in honour of her father who had died of cancer on 15 November 2002, aged 48.

Honours

Field hockey
Ireland
Women's Hockey World Cup
Runners Up: 2018
Women's FIH Hockey World League
Winners: 2015 Dublin, 2017 Kuala Lumpur
Women's EuroHockey Championship II
Winners: 2015
Women's Hockey Champions Challenge I
Runners Up: 2014
Women's FIH Hockey Series
Runners Up: 2019 Banbridge
Women's Four Nations Cup
Runners Up: 2017
Women's Field Hockey Olympic Qualifier
Runners Up: 2012
Loreto
Irish Senior Cup
Winners: 2009–10
Runners Up: 2011–12
Women's Irish Hockey League
Runners Up: 2012–13
EY Champions Trophy
Winners: 2018
EuroHockey Club Champion's Challenge II
Winners: 2011: 1
The High School, Dublin
Leinster Schoolgirls' Senior Cup
Runners Up: 2005: 1

Gaelic football 
Ballyboden Wanderers GAA
Dublin Ladies Junior E Football Championship
Winners: 2008

References

External links
 
 Nicci Daly at Hockey Ireland

1988 births
Living people
Irish female field hockey players
Ireland international women's field hockey players
Female field hockey forwards
Female field hockey midfielders
Dublin inter-county ladies' footballers
Sportspeople from Dublin (city)
Alumni of Cranfield University
Irish racing drivers
Irish mechanical engineers
Irish field hockey coaches
People educated at The High School, Dublin
Women's Irish Hockey League players
Holcombe Hockey Club players
Irish expatriate sportspeople in the United States
Irish expatriate sportspeople in England
Women's England Hockey League players
Field hockey players from County Dublin
Field hockey players at the 2020 Summer Olympics
Nicola
Olympic field hockey players of Ireland